Lake Superior State University (colloquially Lake State, Lake Superior State, Soo Tech, and LSSU) is a public college in Sault Ste. Marie, Michigan. It enrolls approximately 2,000 students. Due to its proximity to the Canadian border, LSSU has many Canadian students and offers joint programs with Sault College and Algoma University in the twin city of Sault Ste. Marie, Ontario, Canada across the St. Marys River. In a sign of this close relationship with its international neighbor, LSSU flies both the Canadian and United States flags on its campus.

LSSU offers primarily bachelor's and associate degrees, but also offers certificates. LSSU has regional centers in northern Michigan in the cities of Gaylord, Escanaba, Petoskey and St. Helen. It also has a center in southeast Michigan in the city of Dearborn. It is one of three Michigan public colleges or universities that is also a community college.

History 

The area that makes up the campus of Lake Superior State University served as Fort Brady from 1894 to 1944; it is listed as "New Fort Brady" on the National Register of Historic Places, as the earlier incarnation of the fort was downhill.

Lake Superior State University was established in 1946 to address the needs of returning World War II veterans and to provide educational opportunities to the people of the Eastern Upper Peninsula. The  campus includes several buildings which are listed in the National Register of Historic Places.

The institution was originally a branch of Michigan College of Mining & Technology, which is now known as Michigan Technological University. It opened in 1946 as the Sault Ste. Marie Residence Center of the Michigan College of Mining & Technology, which was commonly shortened to Soo Tech. The original class consisted of 272 students. The institution was later renamed Lake Superior State College of Michigan Technological University in 1966. The college received autonomy from Michigan Tech in 1970 and was known as Lake Superior State College until 1987, when the institution was granted university status.

The institution's college radio station is WLSO, and its student newspaper is The Compass.

Academics

Lake Superior State's most popular majors, by 2021 graduates, were:
Criminal Justice/Law Enforcement Administration (46)
Registered Nursing/Registered Nurse (34)
Fishing and Fisheries Sciences and Management (29)
Exercise Science and Kinesiology (20)
Business/Commerce (19)
Biology/Biological Sciences (17)

Major buildings 

Administration Building The Administration Building houses the offices of the President and Provost, as well as human resources, purchasing, and public safety.

Arts Center The arts center is a $15 million facility which opened in 2005. The arts center houses a 674-seat auditorium, art, music and dance studios, classrooms and faculty offices. The Arts Center Gallery has a permanent display from the L. F. Noyes Collection of Native American and Western Art.

Brady Hall This building is currently being used as men's freshmen housing. The building is named after Colonel Hugh Brady. Col. Brady was the first commanding officer to serve at Fort Brady. Brady Hall was built as barracks for WACS or Women's Army Corps in 1938.

Brown Hall Built in the 1820s, this building served as the captain's quarters of Fort Brady. Brown Hall wasn't called by its present name until 1982 when it was named for the retired janitor, Edward J. Brown.  In the 1940s, the school as well as this building became a guide for veterans of WWII. Remodeling of this hall took place in 1946. In the 1960s, Brown Hall was converted into a counseling and career center that provided academic advising. It was originally led by Steve Youngs and was later taken on by John Truckey. It one served as the location of the School of Education, and the Fine Arts Program. It now houses the Integrated Marketing Department. Much of the known information about this building can be recovered from the LSSU KJS Library Special Collections room.

CASETThe Center for Applied Science and Engineering Technology is home to the School of Engineering and Technology, as well as the School of Mathematics and Computer Science. CASET also houses the LSSU Robotics Lab and the Product Development Center.

Cisler CenterThe Walker Cisler Student and Conference Center is the main food service and student life building on campus. Dining options include the Quarterdeck and Galley, which features the Grill 155 and a convenience store. It is also home to the Office of Campus Life and Housing, and hosts the Peacock Cove Coffee House, Student Government offices, Student Organization Center, the school newspaper (The Compass), and the University radio station (WLSO).

Crawford HallThis building focuses on the many science degrees offered at the university, from nursing to biology and chemistry, to fisheries and wildlife. In 2000, a $23 million renovation and expansion was completed, providing modern laboratory, classroom, and faculty and student research space. Crawford Hall also houses the LSSU Superior Analytics Laboratory, Ben Long Planetarium, Kemp Mineral Museum, and Café a la Carte.

Fletcher Center Business Operations, Financial Aid, Registrar, and Scheduling can all be found in the former gymnasium for Fort Brady and later, the Soo Tech Hornets. It was named after LSSU benefactor, H. Thayer Fletcher

Norris CenterThis is the main building for recreation, and the School of Criminal Justice, Fire Science and Emergency Medical Services and the School of Recreation and Exercise Science. It is also the main building for the Athletic Department and includes the main office for the Athletic Director. Inside the building lies the Cooper Gym, home of the Laker basketball and volleyball teams; Taffy Abel Arena, home of the Laker hockey team; and the Student Activity Center (SAC), which hosts tennis, track, a weights area and climbing wall. The university has announced a renovation effort to several athletic Norris Center facilities.

Shouldice LibraryThe Kenneth J. Shouldice Library facility houses offices for Social Sciences, Business, English and Communications, and two lecture halls. The main level includes the main circulation desk and audio visual, and the Testing Center. It also offers a student computer lab, interactive TV rooms and the Shouldice Gallery. The lower level is home to the Learning Center, Career Services, and academic supportive services.  The second floor has a special collections room with five special collections including the Oschner Collection, and a group of Native American, Mayan, European, and African American artifacts and books.

R.W. Considine HallFormerly, South Hall, R.W. Considine Hall is the newest capital project at LSSU. It was formally dedicated April 21, 2017 and houses LSSU's Lukenda School of Business providing state-of the art facilities for all campus programs. A three-year, $13.5 million project took the existing 32,000 sq. ft. South Hall and added another 12,000 sq. feet to provide an interactive commons with an expanded cafe, new program and conference rooms, faculty offices and support spaces, a securities trading lab, the Frenchie LaJoie Board Room, and a Center for Entrepreneurship and Innovation that will serve the twin Sault Communities on both sides of the U.S. and Canadian border.

The LSSU Foundation Office raised $3.6 million in its capital campaign for the project ($600,000 more than expected). The State of Michigan provided $9 million. The building's namesake - Robert W. Considine - partnered with LSSU's Foundation Office in 2014 to push the project over its funding goal by matching gifts up to $450,000.

South Hall

Built in 1903, South Hall was originally built to house Fort Brady's infantry soldiers. The infantry barracks were originally composed of twin buildings. South Hall's twin stood approximately 80 feet to the west of South Hall, and was known as the Forestry Building. The two buildings were connected by a third building, which was a one-floor 80 ft by 40 ft wooden structure consisting of an outer shell with a hard wood floor. The building was referred to as the "drill floor". ROTC cadets practiced marching in the building during inclement weather; otherwise, drills took place outside on the parade grounds, which is where the Kenneth Shouldice Library now stands.
The Forestry building was destroyed by fire in the early 1960s. The drill floor building was not damaged but was razed during the demolition of the Forestry Building. The floor itself was scavenged and sold. Prior to this time, South Hall was always referred to as the Library although the library only took up a portion of the building. The Campus Book Store used two floors before moving to the renovated Canusa Hall, which saw dining services move to the Cisler Center.

Admissions 

LSSU is considered "selective" by U.S. News & World Report. For the Class of 2025 (enrolling Fall 2021), LSSU received 2,309 applications and accepted 1,680 (72.8%), with 324 enrolling. The middle 50% range of SAT scores for enrolling freshmen was 963-1178. The middle 50% ACT composite score range was 19-27.

Notable facilities
Aquatic Research LaboratoryThe LSSU ARL is an off campus research and educational facility in the east end of the Cloverland Electric Coop hydroelectric plant. The ARL houses the University's fish hatchery, and conducts research on fisheries and aquatic ecology in the region. Since 1984 the Aquatic Research Laboratory has released 40,000 Atlantic salmon into the St.Mary's River.

Superior Analytics LaboratoryThe SAL is housed in the chemistry department at LSSU, and provides analytical services to LSSU researchers, government agencies, businesses, and private citizens. The SAL routinely conducts standard environmental testing, as well as trace level analysis of environmental contaminants such as pesticides, persistent organic pollutants, metals, and cyanotoxins. Revenues from the SAL assist the Chemistry Department in purchasing and maintaining state of the art analytical instrumentation, and provide students with employment opportunities and experience working in a professional lab.

Product Development Center The PDC provides a mechanism by which small businesses and entrepreneurs can access the expertise of the LSSU engineering faculty and students to produce low cost, functional prototypes. The PDC provides a range of services including rapid prototyping, component design and testing, machining, process optimization, statistical analysis, and documentation services.

Robotics Lab The LSSU Robotics Lab is a multimillion-dollar facility dedicated to student instruction in robotics and automation technology. Robotic workcells use FANUC, Stäubli, and Kuka industrial robots.

Simulation Center In the fall of 2018, through a collaboration with a community member of interest, the Lake Superior State University/War Memorial Hospital (LSSU/WMH) Simulation Center was created as a partnership and allowed the Simulation Center to be moved to an on-campus location. This center is housed in a newly renovated space in the Arts Center Building. With a little more than 4,000 sq. feet, the simulation center provides a wide range of simulated experiences for students using high-fidelity male, female, pediatric, and infant simulators. There are three designated patient care areas each with their own control and debriefing rooms. Each patient room consists of working infusion pumps, headwall units, patient monitors, and simulated electronic health records. There is a spacious medication/supply area with a simulated medication-dispensing unit. Because the simulation center provides learning experiences as part of the paramedic program, a simulated ambulance was purchased during the fall 2018 semester, which provides for an increased ability to coordinate and run Interprofessional simulation experiences.

Traditions
Lake Superior State University has a variety of traditions.

 Banished Words List: Each new year brings another installment of the school's “List of Words and Phrases Banished from the Queen's English for Mis-Use, Over-Use and General Uselessness”. It has been published since New Year's Day 1976 and receives significant media coverage. Word-watchers pull nominations throughout the year from everyday speech, as well as from the news, fields of education, technology, advertising, politics, and more. A committee gathers the entries and chooses the best in December. The list is released on New Year's Day. Hoholik Victory Bell: The bell, outside the Norris Center and Taffy Abel Arena, is rung after each home victory. Fans gather around the bell as members of the hockey team make their way outside in the cold temperatures to ring the bell. This tradition was started after the bell was hung in the early 1980s. The original bell was replaced in 1992 after extensive damage from the 1992 NCAA Championship celebration.
 Ship's Horn: An authentic ship's horn is within the Taffy Abel Arena, where the Lakers play home hockey games. The horn is mounted high on the wall behind the goal a visiting team defends for two periods.  The powerful horn, operated on compressed air, blasts after each Laker goal and at the end of each home game.
 Snowman Burning: Each March, on or near the first day of Spring, students, alumni and townsfolk gather around a 10 to  snowman on campus and light it on fire. The snowman burning is derived from a German tradition in which the mayor of the town melts snowflakes to declare an end to winter. The snowmen are usually made out of recycled paper and wire. In 1992, the event was canceled due to protests from the Environmental Awareness Club, a student group at Lake Superior State University. This decision upset many people. Calls came in from all over the country. Radio stations, newspapers, citizens, alumni, and local people were all angry. A student poll was taken by The Compass (Lake State's campus newspaper) in the fall semester after the cancelled year of the snowman burning. Of 500 students polled, 450 voted to burn a snowman. After receiving so many complaints the tradition was reinstated the following year in 1993.
 Snowmobile Race: The city of Sault Ste. Marie puts on the annual I-500 snowmobile race held at a one-mile (1.6 km) oval behind the Norris Center on the campus of Lake State. The event draws a big crowd and is held the first Saturday of February.
 The Unicorn Hunters'' established the banished words list and snowman burning. They also put on stone-skipping tournaments and started a literary magazine. As their name suggests, they also searched for unicorns. Once an ABC News crew found their way to the campus and filmed students "questing for unicorns." "The Quest, of course, is the pursuit of the unicorn, and the unicorn is one's personal vision of perfection or happiness (McWhirter)."

Athletics

The school's official nickname is the Lakers, but in some instances the athletic teams are called the Soo Lakers in reference to the institution's hometown. Prior to becoming known as the Lakers, sports teams were known as the Hornets. The most prominent sport at LSSU is men's ice hockey, which is the school's only NCAA Division I program. The men's ice hockey team is a member of the Central Collegiate Hockey Association, being one of seven teams that left the Western Collegiate Hockey Association after the 2020–21 season to reestablish the CCHA. Other sports at LSSU play at a Division II level in the Great Lakes Intercollegiate Athletic Conference, of which LSSU is a charter member. At $1284 per student, in 2015 the student subsidy for athletics at LSSU was the highest among all Michigan's public universities (this compares to $14 at MSU and $6 at U-M).(24)

Notable alumni

Bates Battaglia, 1994–1997, professional hockey player
Rick Comley, college hockey coach
Chris Dahlquist, professional hockey player
Jim Dowd 1987–1991, professional hockey player
John Gallant, professional lacrosse player
John Grahame, 1994–1997, professional hockey player
Dan Keczmer, professional hockey player
Darrin Madeley, professional hockey player
Terry McDermott, Olympic speed skater
Eric Menk, 1992–1996, professional basketball player
Nathan Perkovich, professional hockey player
Steven Rinella 1995, author, travel writer, and outdoor television host
Brian Rolston, 1991–1993, professional hockey player
Steven Oleksy, 2006–2009, professional hockey player
Derek Smith, 2004–2007, professional hockey player
Rob Valicevic, 1991–1995, professional hockey player
Doug Weight, 1989–1991, professional hockey coach
Jim Wiley, 1968–72, professional hockey player

References

External links 

 
 Lakers Athletics

 
Liberal arts colleges in Michigan
Public universities and colleges in Michigan
Education in Chippewa County, Michigan
Sault Ste. Marie, Michigan
Buildings and structures in Chippewa County, Michigan
Historic districts on the National Register of Historic Places in Michigan
National Register of Historic Places in Chippewa County, Michigan
Educational institutions established in 1946
1946 establishments in Michigan
Tourist attractions in Chippewa County, Michigan